Samuel Larry Anoa'i Fatu (born October 11, 1965) is an American retired professional wrestler. He is best known for his appearances with the World Wrestling Federation under the ring names The Tonga Kid and Tama and with World Championship Wrestling as The Samoan Savage.

Professional wrestling career

World Wrestling Federation (1983–1988) 

Fatu debuted as a professional wrestler in 1983, after being trained by the Wild Samoans. Shortly after debuting he joined the World Wrestling Federation as "Samoan No. 4," wrestling at untelevised house shows before making his television debut in the fall of 1983 as the Tonga Kid. Billed as the cousin of Superfly Jimmy Snuka, he entered into his first major feud with Snuka's rival Roddy Piper.

In late 1986, he teamed with Tonga Fifita, who was wrestling under the name King Tonga. Fatu was renamed to Tama, while Fifita was renamed to Haku. Together, they were christened The Islanders. The Islanders gained several key victories, including a tag team battle royal victory over Big John Studd and King Kong Bundy, but ultimately failed to gain the interest of fans. The two were eventually repackaged as villains in April 1987 after attacking The Can-Am Connection during a match; the team was now managed by Bobby Heenan, and used an aggressive, savage style of wrestling as opposed to a scientific style.

When Tom Zenk of the Can-Ams left the WWF later in 1987, the Islanders continued the feud with his partner Rick Martel and ultimately with Martel's new team Strike Force with Tito Santana, and while the two teams generally traded victories during the early part of the feud, once Strike Force won the WWF Tag Team Championship, the Islanders began finding themselves on the losing end, despite having several attempts. In early December 1987, the Islanders were disqualified from a match with the British Bulldogs when they kidnapped the Bulldogs' dog, Matilda. The Islanders were indefinitely suspended in the storyline until Matilda was found. From late January 1988 until early February, the Islanders were consistently beaten by the British Bulldogs.

At a Saturday Night's Main Event XV on March 7, they beat The Killer Bees, a tag team consisting of Brian Blair and Jim Brunzell. At Wrestlemania 4, the Islanders, with Bobby Heenan, defeated the Bulldogs and Koko B. Ware, with Matilda. On April 21, Heenan introduced Siva Afi as the newest member of the group, but Afi never made another appearance with the Islanders. Fatu then left the WWF.

World Wrestling Council (1989)
After leaving the WWF, Fatu began performing for the World Wrestling Council in Puerto Rico as "Tama". On January 6, 1989, he and Dan Kroffat defeated The Batten Twins to win the WWC World Tag Team Championship. The Batten Twins regained the championship on March 4, 1989.

World Championship Wrestling (1989–1990) 

In 1989, Fatu joined World Championship Wrestling, where he adopted the ring name "The Samoan Savage" and began teaming with his brother Fatu and his cousin Samu as The Samoan SWAT Team. The trio were managed by "The Big Kahuna" Oliver Humperdink. In late 1989, Samu withdrew from in-ring competition and The Samoan SWAT Team was renamed "The New Wild Samoans". At Starrcade in December 1989, The New Wild Samoans competed in the Iron Team round-robin tournament, placing third in a field of four teams.

The New Wild Samoans left WCW in the summer of 1990.

Later career (1990–2011) 
After leaving WCW, Fatu (wrestling as "The Samoan Savage") journeyed to Mexico to perform for the Universal Wrestling Association along with his brother Fatu and his cousin, The Great Kokina. Billed as "The Hawaiian Beasts", the trio won the UWA World Trios Championship from Los Villanos on April 7, 1991. Los Villanos regained the championship on May 31, 1991. Fatu wrestled three matches for ECW in April 1998.
  
Fatu competed on the independent circuit until retiring in 2011. In 2005 and 2006, he wrestled in Italy with the Nu Wrestling Evolution promotion.

Other media 
Fatu appeared as "The Tonga Kid" in the opening scene of the 1986 film Highlander, where he was involved in a six-man tag team match with Greg Gagne and Jim Brunzell against The Fabulous Freebirds at the Meadowlands Arena. He also starred as "Tonga Tom" in the 1987 wrestling film Body Slam, along with Dirk Benedict and Roddy Piper.

Fatu was featured in an April 2020 documentary for Vice's Dark Side of the Ring series, revealing new information on the May 1983 homicide of Nancy Argentino.

Personal life 

Fatu was born to Matagaono Solofa I'aulaulo and Elevera Anoa'i Fatu. He is a member of the famous Anoaʻi family and is the nephew of Sika Anoaʻi and Afa Anoaʻi, known as the Wild Samoans. He is the twin brother of Solofa Fatu Jr. (Headshrinker Fatu/Rikishi). Samuel is the father of Jacob Fatu, who currently wrestles for Major League Wrestling (MLW). In November 2008, Fatu's wife, Theresa Fuavai-Fatu, went into cardiac arrest while giving birth. Her heart stopped completely before the twins, Marley and Myracle, could be delivered by Caesarean section, but she was spontaneously revived and eventually recovered. This type of incident is very rare, with one of the cardiac surgeons who was working on Theresa saying that he had never seen surviving mothers or babies. Samuel is the older brother of Eddie Fatu (Umaga/Jamal), who died of a heart attack on December 4, 2009.

Other members of the family in professional wrestling include Solofa's twin sons, Jonathan and Joshua Samuel, who currently wrestle in WWE as Jimmy Uso and Jey Uso, and their younger brother Joseph Fatu who debuted in WWE NXT as Solo Sikoa at NXT: Halloween Havoc (2021). His cousins in wrestling are Rodney Anoaʻi (Yokozuna), Samula Anoaʻi (Headshrinker Samu), Matt Anoaʻi (Rosey), Joe Anoaʻi (Roman Reigns), Reno Anoaʻi (Black Pearl), Afa Anoaʻi Jr. (Manu), and Lloyd Anoaʻi (L.A. Smooth). Dwayne Johnson (The Rock) is also considered to be a cousin of Samuel because of the blood brothership between Samuel's great grandfather Reverend Amituana'i Anoa'i and The Rock's grandfather Peter Maivia.

Championships and accomplishments
Continental Championship Wrestling
NWA Southeastern Tag Team Championship (3 times) - with Johnny Rich
Texas All-Star Wrestling
Texas Six-Man Tag Team Championship - (1 time) with Sika and Kokina
Universal Wrestling Association
UWA World Trios Championship (1 time) – with Fatu and The Great Kokina
World Wrestling Council
WWC World Tag Team Championship (1 time) – with Dan Kroffat
World Wrestling Federation
Slammy Award (1 time)
Bobby "The Brain" Heenan Scholarship Award (1987) with Haku, André the Giant, Hercules, King Kong Bundy, and Harley Race

See also
 Anoaʻi family
 The Islanders
 The Samoan SWAT Team

References

External links 
 
 

1965 births
20th-century professional wrestlers
21st-century professional wrestlers
American male professional wrestlers
American people of Samoan descent
American professional wrestlers of Samoan descent
Anoa'i family
The Heenan Family members
Living people
Professional wrestlers from California
American twins
UWA World Trios Champions